Yeo Yeong-gug (born 28 January 1965) is a South Korean politician who led the Justice Party from 2021 to 2022. He was previously a member of the National Assembly from 2019 until 2020, and also served on the South Gyeongsang Provincial Council.

Life 
Yeo Yeong-gug was born on 28 January 1965 in Sacheon, South Gyeongsang Province. As a young man, he also worked as a senior official of the Korean Metal Workers' Union while working with labour movements.

He entered the political world, leaving the labor movement, and has since been elected as member of the South Gyeongsang Provincial Council in the 2010 local elections. He was also elected in the 2014 elections, but lost in the 2018 election. After Roh Hoe-chan's death, he ran for the by-election in the Seongsan District, Changwon. On 25 March 2019, the Democratic Party's candidate Kwon Min-ho withdrew from the by-election as a candidate and declared his support for Yeo Yeong-gug.

References

External links 
 Yeo Yeong-gug's official website

1965 births
Living people
People from Sacheon
People from South Gyeongsang Province
Korean trade unionists
Members of the National Assembly (South Korea)
Justice Party (South Korea) politicians